Kathleen Rooney is an American writer, publisher, editor, and educator.

Early life and education
Kathleen Rooney was born in Beckley, West Virginia and raised in the Midwest.  She earned a B.A. from the George Washington University and an M.F.A. in Writing, Literature, and Publishing from Emerson College. While at Emerson, she was awarded a 2003 Ruth Lilly Fellowship from Poetry Magazine.

Career
Rooney's first book, Reading with Oprah: the Book Club That Changed America, an in-depth analysis of the cultural and literary impacts of Oprah's Book Club, was published by University of Arkansas Press in 2005 and reissued in 2008. Her first poetry collection, Oneiromance (an epithalamion) won the 2007 Gatewood Prize from feminist publisher Switchback Books.

Rooney was named one of the Best New Voices of 2006 by Random House, which included her essay "Live Nude Girl" in their influential anthology Twentysomething Essays by Twentysomething Writers. A book-length version, titled Live Nude Girl: My Life as an Object, was published by University of Arkansas Press in 2009.

In 2006, Rooney and Abigail Beckel co-founded Rose Metal Press, an independent not-for-profit publisher of hybrid genres (short short, flash, and micro-fiction; prose poetry; novels-in-verse; book-length linked narrative poems).

Rooney is a frequent collaborator with the poet Elisa Gabbert, with whom she has co-authored the collections Something Really Wonderful (2007), That Tiny Insane Voluptuousness (2008), Don't ever stay the same; keep changing (2009), and The Kind of Beauty That Has Nowhere to Go (2013).

In 2011, with poets Dave Landsberger and Eric Plattner, Rooney co-founded the Chicago not-for-profit poetry collective Poems While You Wait, which composes typewritten poetry on demand at local libraries, street & music festivals, museums, & art galleries.

Rooney's 2012 novel-in-verse Robinson Alone was inspired by the life & work of poet Weldon Kees and his alter-ego persona-character "Robinson". Her debut novel, O, Democracy!, was released by Fifth Star Press in Spring 2014 and her second novel, Lillian Boxfish Takes a Walk, loosely based on the life of Margaret Fishback, was released by St. Martin's Press in 2017. In 2020, Penguin released her third novel Cher Ami and Major Whittlesey, inspired by the true World War I story of the Lost Battalion.

A former U.S. Senate Aide, Rooney is a professor at DePaul University. She lives in Chicago with her husband, the writer Martin Seay and author of The Mirror Thief.

Selected publications 
 Cher Ami and Major Whittlesey, Penguin, 2020, 
 Lillian Boxfish Takes a Walk, St. Martin's Press, 2017, 
 O, Democracy!, Fifth Star Press, 2014, 
 The Kind of Beauty That Has Nowhere to Go (with Elisa Gabbert, Hyacinth Girl Press, 2013)
 Robinson Alone, Gold Wake Press, 2012, 
  
 Live Nude Girl: My Life as an Object, University of Arkansas Press, 2009, 
 Don't ever stay the same; keep changing (with Elisa Gabbert, Spooky Girlfriend Press, 2009)
 Oneiromance (an epithalamion), Switchback Books, 2008,  
 
 Something Really Wonderful (with Elisa Gabbert, Dancing Girl Press, 2007)
 
 Included in The &NOW Awards 2: The Best Innovative Writing (&NOW Books, 2013)

References

External links 
 Kathleen Rooney's author site

Living people
American women poets
George Washington University alumni
Emerson College alumni
People from Beckley, West Virginia
Novelists from West Virginia
DePaul University faculty
American women novelists
American political writers
Writers from Chicago
21st-century American novelists
American women essayists
21st-century American women writers
21st-century American poets
21st-century American essayists
Novelists from Illinois
Year of birth missing (living people)